Livezeni  is a commune in Mureș County, Transylvania, Romania composed of four villages:
Ivănești / Kebeleszentiván
Livezeni
Poienița / Marosagárd
Sânișor / Kebele

In 2004, Corunca, along with the village of Bozeni, broke away from Livezeni to form an independent commune.

History 

It formed part of the Székely Land region of the historical Transylvania province. Until 1918, the village belonged to the Háromszék County of the Kingdom of Hungary. After the Treaty of Trianon of 1920, it became part of Romania.

Demographics

According to the 2002 census, the commune had a population of 2.032.

According to the 2011 census, the population increased to 3.266, 50,21% of which declared themselves as being Hungarian, 30,86% Romanian, 15,62% Rroma while 3% did not declare an ethnicity.

See also 
 List of Hungarian exonyms (Mureș County)

References

Communes in Mureș County
Localities in Transylvania